Xylomoia chagnoni, Chagnon's borer moth, is a species of cutworm or dart moth in the family Noctuidae. It was first described by William Barnes and James Halliday McDunnough in 1917 and it is found in North America.

The MONA or Hodges number for Xylomoia chagnoni is 9433.

References

Further reading

 
 
 

Noctuinae
Articles created by Qbugbot
Moths described in 1917